Bertrange is a commune and town in Luxembourg. This is a list of its mayors.

List

Footnotes

Bertrange